Palestina is a village in Litoral del San Juan Municipality, Chocó Department in Colombia.

Climate
Palestina has a very wet tropical rainforest climate (Af).

References

Populated places in the Chocó Department